Minna Marie Gombell (née Gombel; May 28, 1892 – April 14, 1973) was an American stage and film actress.

Early years
She was born Minna Marie Gombel in Baltimore, Maryland, the daughter of William and Emma M. Debring Gombel. Her father was a medical doctor who came to the United States from Germany in 1880. Her mother was from Baltimore and of German descent.

Life and work
Gombell was active in stock theater, starring with troupes in Albany, Atlanta, Cleveland, New Orleans, and Los Angeles. Her Broadway credits include Indiscretion (1928), The Great Power (1928), Ballyhoo (1926), Alloy (1924), Mr. Pitt (1923), Listening in (1922), On the Hiring Line (1919), The Indestructible Wife (1917), Six Months' Option (1917), and My Lady's Garter (1915).

She had a successful stage career from 1912 as Winifred Lee before being signed by the Fox Film Corporation in the late 1920s. Her first film was Doctors' Wives (1931) in which she played under the name Nancy Gardner, a name given to her by Fox. After this, she spent a time coaching several young actresses before returning to film under her real name.

She appeared in some fifty Hollywood films including: Block-Heads, The Merry Widow, The First Year, Boom Town, High Sierra, Hoop-La, The Thin Man, Doomed Caravan, and The Best Years of Our Lives.

Personal life 
Gombell married Howard Chesham Rumsey on March 9, 1916, in New York City. They divorced in 1921. In 1922 she was married in secret to the aviator and press agent Ferdinand Eggena in Atlanta, Georgia. Their marriage was revealed when he was arrested for fraud in November. She filed for divorce the next month, which was granted in 1924. On May 19, 1933, she was married for a third time to millionaire banker Joseph W. Sefton Jr.  They separated in 1947 and were divorced in 1954. 

Some sources state she was married to writer/producer Myron C. Fagan, who put Gombell in several plays and films in the 1920s, but Dagan was married during this period to another woman, who died in 1966.

Gombell died in Santa Monica on April 14, 1973, and was buried in Loudon Park Cemetery in Baltimore, Maryland.

Partial filmography

References

External links

1892 births
1973 deaths
American people of German descent
American film actresses
American stage actresses
Actresses from Baltimore
20th-century American actresses